Deir ez-Zor Airport  is an airport serving Deir ez-Zor, a city in northeastern Syria.

History
Deir ez-Zor Airport was established by the British during World War II as LG-416.

Before the war in Syria, airlines like Jazeera Airways and Syrian Air flew to destinations such as Damascus, Aleppo, Bahrain and Kuwait.

On October 15, 2012, heavy artillery and missiles strikes, originating in the airport, hit the city. On 24 November 2012, rebels were surrounding the airport. During the night of 6 December 2014, ISIL took control over the missile battalion to the northeast of the airport and stormed the airbase itself, but failed to seize it. 

On 5 September 2017, Syrian special operations Tiger Forces and 17th Division troops started an offensive to eventually capture Thardeh Mountains (under the control of ISIL fighters since CJTF-OIR forces had conducted the September 2016 Deir ez-Zor air raid upon then-besieged Syrian Army soldiers) and lift ISIL's siege of the airport. On 9 September 2017, the Syrian SANA news agency reported that Syrian forces had broken the siege at the airport. Russia's Defense Ministry said the lifting of the siege had followed ″a massive airstrike by Russian Aerospace Forces″.

Facilities

Airlines and destinations
As of December 2022, there are no regular flights scheduled to or from the airport.

References

External links

Airport at the flightradar24.com

Airports in Syria
Buildings and structures in Deir ez-Zor